Open-source record labels are record labels that release music under copyleft licenses, that is, licenses that allow free redistribution and may allow free modification of the tracks.

They present free, libre, and open content, and present this a part of the freedoms of expression and speech, with the goal of opening up the possibilities of media through open collaboration. Some musicians dislike corporate control of music via means of copyright and believe that creativity requires that musicians reappropriate and reinterpret music and sounds to enable them to create truly innovative music. Additionally, copyleft enables musicians to develop music collaboratively.

Examples of open-source labels
 50/50innertainment Records
 Club Late Music
 Calabash Music
 Loca Records
 Magnatune
 OnClassical
 Opsound
 Voidance Records

Some other labels, like NoCopyrightSounds, give broad royalty-free license which is open content.

See also
 Open Content
 Creative Commons licenses
 Jamendo

References

External links
 Chameleon Lectra (Consemble 'open compositions' projects)
 Open Source Musical
 CommonEdits
 Creative Commons licensed audio media
 Red Plastic Label

Open content
Free culture movement
Record labels
Netlabels